Miguel Ángel Russo (born 9 April 1956)  is an Argentine professional football manager and former player who played as a defensive midfielder. He is the current manager of Rosario Central.

Playing career

Club career
Russo was a one club man; he played his entire career for Estudiantes de La Plata, from 1975 to his retirement in 1988. A defensive midfielder, Russo was a staple of the team that won two back-to-back championships in the 1982–83 season.

International career
Although Russo was called on by national team coach Carlos Bilardo to play in the 1986 FIFA World Cup qualifiers, a string of minor injuries prevented him from traveling to the main event in Mexico, which Argentina ultimately won.

Coaching career

His career as a coach included stints at Estudiantes de La Plata and Lanús (both of whom he helped promote), and other sides in Argentina, Mexico, Chile, and Spain.

In June 2005, he won the 2005 Clausura tournament with Vélez Sarsfield, his first title as a coach in the Argentine top division. On 15 December 2006, he was signed by Boca Juniors to replace Ricardo La Volpe.

With Russo at the helm, Boca Juniors took second place in the 2007 Clausura tournament and won the 2007 Copa Libertadores. After Boca, Russo managed San Lorenzo de Almagro between 2008 and 2009. After losing to San Luis and being eliminated form the Copa Libertadores, the coach has announced his decision to resign on 9 April 2009.

On 15 April 2009, Russo joined Rosario Central, replacing Reinaldo Merlo and just two months later on 14 July 2009 the coach quit the team.

The former midfielder then managed Racing Club between 2010 and 2011. On 21 June 2011, less than a week after resigning as coach of Racing Club, Russo signed a contract to again coach his former club, Estudiantes de La Plata, being his second stint as an Estudiantes coach, having done so in 1994.

On 6 November 2011, after Estudiantes was defeated 1-3 by Godoy Cruz and in turn falling to last place with only 10 points in 14 games, Russo resigned as manager, less than 5 months after having assumed charge. He then had a successful stint at Rosario Central, winning the 2012–13 Primera B Nacional and reaching the final of the 2013–14 Copa Argentina.

In 2015, Russo agreed to become manager of Vélez Sarsfield, his second spell at the club.

On 23 December 2016, he was chosen to train Millonarios F.C. from Bogotá, Colombia after the untimely departure of Diego Cocca. On 17 December 2017, he was crowned Champion of the second half of 2017 with Millonarios F.C. (Torneo Clausura), to which he gave them the title number 15 after winning the first leg 1-0, and then drawing 2-2 against Independiente Santa Fe. With this victory, Millonarios F.C. will go directly to the group stage of the Copa Libertadores played among the best club teams in South America.

On January 4, 2019, he is officially appointed as the new Alianza Lima coach. However, he decides to terminate his contract for personal reasons and poor results.

On June 7, 2019, his transfer to Cerro Porteño was made official. On October 6, 2019, after losing to Deportivo Capiatá, the club decides to do without its services.

In January 2020, he started his second cycle with Boca Juniors. two months later he obtained a new title winning the 2019-20 Superliga beating River Plate led by Marcelo Gallardo in the final stretch.  After been eliminated by Santos (BRA) from the Conmebol Libertadores, Boca Juniors played Copa Diego Maradona final against Banfield. This match ended in a tie in one, and finally, Boca Juniors became champions by winning the penalties. On 17 August 2021 he was sacked by the club.

Russo spent the most of the 2021–22 season in charge of Al-Nassr in Saudi Arabia, before returning to Rosario Central on 18 December 2022.

Personal life
Russo's son, Ignacio, is a professional footballer.

Managerial statistics

Honours

Player

Estudiantes de La Plata
Primera División: 1982 Metropolitano, 1983 Nacional

Manager
Lanús
Primera B Nacional: 1991–92

Estudiantes
Primera B Nacional: 1994–95

Vélez Sarsfield
Primera División: 2005 Clausura

Boca Juniors
Primera División: 2019–20
Copa de la Liga Profesional: 2020
Copa Libertadores: 2007

Rosario Central
Primera B Nacional: 2012–13

Millonarios
Categoría Primera A: 2017 Finalización
Superliga Colombiana: Superliga 2018

Individual
Saudi Professional League Manager of the Month: January 2022

References

External links

 
  

1956 births
Living people
Argentine people of Italian descent
Argentine footballers
Argentina international footballers
1983 Copa América players
Estudiantes de La Plata footballers
Argentine Primera División players
Sportspeople from Lanús
Argentine football managers
Argentine expatriate football managers
UD Salamanca managers
Club Atlético Los Andes managers
Club Atlético Lanús managers
Universidad de Chile managers
Estudiantes de La Plata managers
Rosario Central managers
Atlético Morelia managers
Club Atlético Colón managers
Club Atlético Vélez Sarsfield managers
Boca Juniors managers
San Lorenzo de Almagro managers
Racing Club de Avellaneda managers
Al Nassr FC managers
Saudi Professional League managers
Expatriate football managers in Chile
Expatriate football managers in Mexico
Expatriate football managers in Saudi Arabia
Argentine expatriate sportspeople in Chile
Argentine expatriate sportspeople in Mexico
Argentine expatriate sportspeople in Saudi Arabia
Association football midfielders